Panpayak Jitmuangnon (พันธุ์พยัคฆ์ จิตรเมืองนนท์) is a Thai Muay Thai fighter, originally from the Samut Prakarn, but now fighting out of Bangkok, Thailand. Panpayak is the current Lumpinee Stadium featherweight Champion. He is the former Lumpinee Stadium bantamweight champion and former Rajadamnern light flyweight and Rajadamnern mini flyweight champion.
Panpayak holds wins over fighters such as Sam-A Kaiyanghadaogym, Prajanchai P.K.Saenchaimuaythaigym, Wanchalong PKSaenchaimuaythaigym, Jomhod Sakami and Aikmongkol Gaiyanghadaogym.

He is the first fighter in the history of the sport to win the Sports Writers of Thailand Fighter of the Year thrice in a row.

Muay Thai career
The Sportswriters Association of Thailand voted him their 2013 "Fighter of the Year". Panpayak was undefeated in 2013.

In May 2014, Panpayak fought Ponakrit Sorjor Wichitpidriew at the Lumpini Stadium. He won the fight by a unanimous decision.

Panpayak was scheduled to fight Wanchalong PK.Saenchai in June 2014 at the Lumpini Stadium. He won the fight by a fifth round TKO.

He won the Lumpini Stadium Bantamweight title in August 2018, through a decision win over Suakim Sit Sor Thor Taew.

Panpayak was scheduled to fight Prajanchai P.K.Saenchaimuaythaigym for the Lumpini Stadium Bantamweight title. He had three months previously lost the title to Prajanchai. Panpayak regained the title by a unanimous decision.

Panpayak made his ONE Championship debut in September 2019, when he was scheduled to fight Masahide Kudo. He won the fight by a unanimous decision.

He fought Superlek Kiatmuu9, for the seventh time, during ONE Championship: No Surrender. Superlek won the fight by a unanimous decision.

Panpayak faced Savvas Michael in the quarterfinals of the ONE Muay Thai Flyweight Grand Prix at ONE on Prime Video 1 on August 27, 2022. He won after knocking out Michael witha  head kick in the second round.

Panpayak was scheduled to face Superlek Kiatmuu9 in the ONE Flyweight Muay Thai World Grand Prix Tournament final bout on October 22, 2022, at ONE on Prime Video 3. However, Superlek withdrawn from the event due to training injuries. The pair was rescheduled to meet at ONE 164 on December 3, 2022. At weigh-ins, the pair failed to make weight in the flyweight division and disqualified from the tournament, agreed to compete in the 138 lbs catchweight. He lost the fight by split decision.

Panpayak is scheduled to face Nabil Anane on March 17, 2023, at ONE Friday Fights 9.

Championships and accomplishments

Titles
Lumpinee Stadium
2015 2-time Lumpinee Stadium Featherweight (126 lbs) Champion
2014 2-time Lumpinee Stadium Bantamweight (118 lbs) Champion 

Rajadamnern Stadium 
2013 Rajadamnern Stadium Light flyweight (108 lbs) champion 
2012 Rajadamnern Stadium Mini flyweight (105 lbs) champion (1 defense)

Awards
ONE Championship 
Performance of the Night (One time) 
2022 Muay Thai Knockout of the Year 

Sports Writers of Thailand 
2015 Sports Writers of Thailand Fighter of the Year
2014 Sports Writers of Thailand Fighter of the Year
2013 Sports Writers of Thailand Fighter of the Year

Fight record

{{Fight record start|title=Muay Thai Record|record=248 Wins, 41 Losses, 3 Draws}}

|-  style="background:#fbc;"
| 2022-12-03 || Loss ||align=left| Superlek Kiatmuu9 || ONE 164: Pacio vs. Brooks ||  Manila, Philippines || Decision (Split) || 3 || 3:00 || 233-41-4
|-
|- style="background:#CCFFCC;"
| 2022-08-27|| Win ||align=left| Savvas Michael || ONE on Prime Video 1 || Kallang, Singapore || KO (Head kick) || 2 || 0:10 || 233-40-4 
|-
! style=background:white colspan=9 |
|- style="background:#CCFFCC;"
| 2021-10-29|| Win ||align=left| Daniel Puertas || ONE Championship: NextGen III || Kallang, Singapore || Decision (Unanimous) || 3 || 3:00 || 232-40-4
|-  style="background:#cfc;"
| 2021-04-08|| Win ||align=left| Chamuaktong Fightermuaythai || Mahakam Muay RuamPonKon Chana + Petchyindee|| Songkhla Province, Thailand || Decision || 5 || 3:00 || 231-40-4
|- style="background:#fbc;"
| 2020-07-31|| Loss ||align=left| Superlek Kiatmuu9 || ONE Championship: No Surrender || Bangkok, Thailand || Decision (Unanimous) || 3 ||3:00 ||230-40-4
|- style="background:#cfc;"
| 2019-11-28|| Win ||align=left| Panpayak Sitchefboontham || Rajadamnern Stadium || Bangkok, Thailand || Decision || 5 || 3:00 ||230-39-4
|- style="background:#cfc;"
| 2019-09-06|| Win ||align=left| Masahide Kudo || ONE Championship: Immortal Triumph || Ho Chi Minh City, Vietnam || Decision (Unanimous) || 3 ||3:00 ||229-39-4
|- style="background:#cfc;"
| 2019-08-16|| Win ||align=left| Kaonar P.K.SaenchaiMuaythaiGym || Supit + Sor. Sommai Birthday Fights || Songkla, Thailand || Decision || 5 || 3:00 ||228-39-4
|- style="background:#cfc;"
| 2019-07-18|| Win ||align=left| Yamin PKsaenchaimuaythaigym || Rajadamnern Stadium || Bangkok, Thailand || Decision || 5 || 3:00 ||227-39-4
|- style="background:#fbc;"
| 2019-01-31|| Loss ||align=left| Muangthai PKSaenchaimuaythaigym || Rajadamnern Stadium || Bangkok, Thailand || KO (Left elbow) || 3 || ||226-39-4
|- style="background:#cfc;"
| 2018-12-07|| Win ||align=left| Rui Botelho || ONE Championship: Destiny of Champions || Kuala Lumpur, Malaysia || Decision (Unanimous) || 3 || 3:00 ||226-38-4
|- style="background:#cfc;"
| 2018-10-27|| Win ||align=left| Ehsan Khorshidvand || Thai Fight ||Thailand || Decision (Unanimous) || 3 || 3:00 ||225-38-4
|- style="background:#cfc;"
| 2018-08-16|| Win ||align=left| Superlek Kiatmuu9 || Rajadamnern Stadium || Bangkok, Thailand || Decision || 5 || 3:00 ||224-38-4
|- style="background:#cfc;"
| 2018-07-07|| Win ||align=left| Davisson Paixao || Thai Fight ||Thailand || Decision (Unanimous) || 3 || 3:00 ||223-38-4
|- style="background:#fbc;"
| 2018-05-12|| Loss ||align=left| Henrique Muller || Thai Fight Samui || Thailand || KO (Left Hook)|| 1 || 1:05 ||222-38-4
|- style="background:#fbc;"
| 2018-02-20|| Loss ||align=left| Yodlekpet Or. Pitisak || Onesongchai Fights, Lumpinee Stadium || Bangkok, Thailand || Decision || 5 || 3:00 ||222-37-4
|- style="background:#cfc;"
| 2017-12-30|| Win ||align=left| Superlek Kiatmuu9 || Petch Buncha, 13th Anniversary || Ko Samui, Thailand || Decision || 5 || 3:00 ||222-36-4
|- style="background:#c5d2ea;"
| 2017-11-06|| Draw ||align=left| Sangmanee Sor Tienpo || Rajadamnern Stadium || Bangkok, Thailand || Decision || 5 || 3:00 ||221-35-4
|- style="background:#cfc;"
| 2017-09-09|| Win ||align=left| Sangmanee Sor Tienpo || Samui Fight || Koh Samet, Thailand || Decision || 5 || 3:00 ||221-35-3
|- style="background:#cfc;"
| 2017-05-31|| Win ||align=left| Saeksan Or. Kwanmuang || Sor. Sommai, Rajadamnern Stadium || Bangkok, Thailand || Decision || 5 || 3:00 ||220-35-3
|- style="background:#cfc;"
| 2017-05-04|| Win ||align=left| Superlek Kiatmuu9 || Petchyindee Fight, Rajadamnern Stadium || Bangkok, Thailand || Decision || 5 || 3:00 ||219-35-3
|- style="background:#cfc;"
| 2017-04-06|| Win ||align=left| Phet Utong Or. Kwanmuang || Jitmuangnont, Rajadamnern Stadium || Bangkok, Thailand || Decision || 5 || 3:00 ||218-35-3
|- style="background:#fbc;"
| 2017-03-02|| Loss ||align=left| Phet Utong Or. Kwanmuang || Rajadamnern Stadium || Bangkok, Thailand || KO (Right hook) || 1 || ||217-36-3
|- style="background:#fbc;"
| 2017-02-02|| Loss ||align=left| Superlek Kiatmuu9 || Petchyindee Fight, Rajadamnern Stadium || Bangkok, Thailand || Decision || 5 || 3:00 ||217-35-3
|- style="background:#cfc;"
| 2016-12-09|| Win ||align=left| Rodlek Jaotalaytong || Lumpinee Stadium || Bangkok, Thailand || Decision || 5 || 3:00 ||217-34-3
|- style="background:#cfc;"
| 2016-11-15|| Win ||align=left| Kaonar P.K.SaenchaiMuaythaiGym || Rajadamnern Stadium || Bangkok, Thailand || Decision || 5 || 3:00 ||216-34-3
|- style="background:#cfc;"
| 2016-09-14|| Win ||align=left| Superbank Mor.Ratanabandit || Rajadamnern Stadium || Bangkok, Thailand || Decision || 5 || 3:00 ||215-34-3
|- style="background:#cfc;"
| 2016-07-08|| Win ||align=left| Chalam Parunchai || Lumpinee Stadium || Bangkok, Thailand || TKO (High kick) || 2 || ||214-34-3
|- style="background:#cfc;"
| 2016-06-09|| Win ||align=left| Kaonar P.K.SaenchaiMuaythaiGym || Onesongchai Fights, Rajadamnern Stadium || Bangkok, Thailand || Decision || 5 || 3:00 ||213-34-3
|- style="background:#fbc;"
| 2016-05-02|| Loss ||align=left| Sangmanee Sor Tienpo || Jitmuangnon Fights, Rajadamnern Stadium || Bangkok, Thailand || Decision || 5 || 3:00 ||212-34-3
|- style="background:#cfc;"
| 2016-03-04|| Win ||align=left| Kaonar P.K.SaenchaiMuaythaiGym || Kriekkrai Fights, Lumpinee Stadium || Bangkok, Thailand || Decision || 5 || 3:00 ||212-33-3
|- style="background:#fbc;"
| 2016-01-28|| Loss ||align=left| Saen Parunchai || Petwithaya Fights, Rajadamnern Stadium || Bangkok, Thailand || Decision || 5 || 3:00 ||211-33-3
|- style="background:#cfc;"
| 2015-12-22|| Win ||align=left| Kaonar P.K.SaenchaiMuaythaiGym || Kiatphet Fights, Lumpinee Stadium || Bangkok, Thailand || Decision || 5 || 3:00 ||211-32-3
|-
! style=background:white colspan=9 |
|- style="background:#cfc;"
| 2015-10-07|| Win ||align=left| Superlek Kiatmuu9 || Rajadamnern Stadium || Bangkok, Thailand || Decision || 5 || 3:00 ||210-32-3
|- style="background:#c5d2ea;"
| 2015-09-09|| Draw ||align=left| Superlek Kiatmuu9 || Rajadamnern Stadium || Bangkok, Thailand || Decision || 5 || 3:00 ||209-32-3
|- style="background:#cfc;"
| 2015-07-02 ||Win||align=left| Parkalek Tor Laksong || Rajadamnern Stadium || Bangkok, Thailand || Decision || 5 || 3:00 ||209-32-2
|-
|- style="background:#fbc;"
| 2015-06-05|| Loss ||align=left| Saen Parunchai || Lumpinee Stadium || Bangkok, Thailand || Decision || 5 || 3:00 ||208-32-2
|- style="background:#cfc;"
|-
! style=background:white colspan=9 |
|-
|- style="background:#cfc;"
| 2015-04-29 ||Win||align=left| Sam-A Kaiyanghadaogym || Rajadamnern Stadium || Bangkok, Thailand || KO(Left high kick) || 1 || 1:20 ||208-31-2
|-
|- style="background:#cfc;"
| 2015-03-06|| Win ||align=left| Sam-A Kaiyanghadaogym || Lumpinee Stadium || Bangkok, Thailand || Decision || 5 || 3:00 ||207-31-2
|-
! style=background:white colspan=9 |
|- style="background:#cfc;"
| 2015-01-08|| Win ||align=left| Luknimit Singklongsi|| Rajadamnern Stadium || Bangkok, Thailand || Decision || 5 || 3:00 ||206-31-2
|- style="background:#cfc;"
| 2014-12-09|| Win ||align=left| Prajanchai P.K.Saenchaimuaythaigym || Lumpinee Stadium || Bangkok, Thailand || Decision || 5 || 3:00 ||205-31-2
|-
! style=background:white colspan=9 |
|- style="background:#cfc;"
| 2014-10-31|| Win ||align=left| Suakim Sit Sor Thor Taew || Lumpinee Stadium || Bangkok, Thailand || Decision || 5 || 3:00 ||204-31-2
|- style="background:#cfc;"
| 2014-10-06|| Win ||align=left| Denchingkwan Lamtongkampet || Rajadamnern Stadium || Bangkok, Thailand || KO (head kick) || 4 || ||203-31-2
|- style="background:#fbc;"
| 2014-09-05|| Loss ||align=left| Prajanchai P.K.Saenchaimuaythaigym || Lumpinee Stadium || Bangkok, Thailand || Decision || 5 || 3:00 ||202-31-2
|-
! style=background:white colspan=9 |
|- style="background:#cfc;"
| 2014-08-08|| Win ||align=left| Suakim Sit Sor Thor Taew || Lumpinee Stadium || Bangkok, Thailand || Decision || 5 || 3:00 ||202-30-2
|-
! style=background:white colspan=9 |
|- style="background:#cfc;"
| 2014-07-17|| Win ||align=left| Pet Or Pimolsri || Rajadamnern Stadium || Bangkok, Thailand || Decision || 5 || 3:00 ||201-30-2
|- style="background:#cfc;"
| 2014-06-06|| Win ||align=left| Wanchalong PK.Saenchai || Lumpinee Stadium || Bangkok, Thailand || TKO (elbow/ref stoppage) || 5 ||3:00 ||200-30-2
|- style="background:#cfc;"
| 2014-05-02|| Win ||align=left| Ponakrit Sorjor Wichitpidriew|| Lumpinee Stadium || Bangkok, Thailand || Decision || 5 || 3:00 ||199-30-2
|- style="background:#fbc;"
| 2014-04-08|| Loss ||align=left| Wanchalong PK.Saenchai || Lumpinee Stadium || Bangkok, Thailand || Decision || 5 || 3:00 ||198-30-2
|-
! style=background:white colspan=9 |
|- style="background:#cfc;"
| 2014-01-10|| Win ||align=left| Chankrit Ekbangsai || Lumpinee Stadium || Bangkok, Thailand || Decision || 5 || 3:00 ||198-29-2
|- style="background:#cfc;"
| 2013-11-04|| Win ||align=left| Ekmongkol Kaiyanghadaogym || Rajadamnern Stadium || Bangkok, Thailand || Decision || 5 || 3:00 ||197-29-2
|- style="background:#cfc;"
| 2013-10-03|| Win ||align=left| Jomhod Eminentair || Rajadamnern Stadium || Bangkok, Thailand || Decision || 5 || 3:00 ||196-29-2
|- style="background:#cfc;"
| 2013-09-11|| Win ||align=left| Trakunpet Sor Sommai || Rajadamnern Stadium || Bangkok, Thailand || KO (head kick) || 1 || ||195-29-2
|- style="background:#cfc;"
| 2013-08-05|| Win ||align=left| Rengsak Sitniwat || Rajadamnern Stadium || Bangkok, Thailand || Decision || 5 || 3:00 ||194-29-2
|- style="background:#cfc;"
| 2013-06-04|| Win ||align=left| Sarawut Pitakpaapardaeng || Lumpinee Stadium || Bangkok, Thailand || Decision || 5 || 3:00 ||193-29-2
|- style="background:#cfc;"
| 2013-05-02|| Win ||align=left| Rengsak Sitniwat || Rajadamnern Stadium || Bangkok, Thailand || Decision || 5 || 3:00 ||192-29-2
|-
! style=background:white colspan=9 |
|- style="background:#cfc;"
| 2013-04-05|| Win ||align=left| Yothin Sakaethongresort || Lumpinee Stadium || Bangkok, Thailand || KO || 2 || ||191-29-2
|- style="background:#c5d2ea;"
| 2013-02-21|| Draw ||align=left| Senkeng Nuicoffeeboran || Rajadamnern Stadium || Bangkok, Thailand || Decision || 5 || 3:00 ||190-29-2
|- style="background:#fbc;"
| 2013-01-23|| Loss ||align=left| Yuthasak Sakburiram || || Buriram, Thailand || Decision || 5 || 3:00 ||190-29-1
|- style="background:#cfc;"
| 2013-01-17|| Win ||align=left| Yodmanoot Petpotong || Rajadamnern Stadium || Bangkok, Thailand || Decision || 5 || 3:00 ||190-28-1
|-
! style=background:white colspan=9 |
|- style="background:#cfc;"
| 2012-11-28|| Win ||align=left| Nikomlek Tor Tawat || Rajadamnern Stadium || Bangkok, Thailand || Decision || 5 || 3:00 ||
|- style="background:#fbc;"
| 2012-10-11|| Loss ||align=left| Pet Or Pimolsri || Rajadamnern Stadium || Bangkok, Thailand || Decision || 5 || 3:00 ||
|- style="background:#cfc;"
| 2012-09-20|| Win ||align=left| Detkart Por Pongsawang || Rajadamnern Stadium || Bangkok, Thailand || Decision || 5 || 3:00 ||
|-
! style=background:white colspan=9 |
|- style="background:#cfc;"
| 2012-06-28|| Win ||align=left| Dokmaidang JSP || Rajadamnern Stadium || Bangkok, Thailand || Decision || 5 || 3:00 ||
|- style="background:#cfc;"
| 2012-04-19|| Win ||align=left| Petlamsin Kiatphontip || Rajadamnern Stadium || Bangkok, Thailand || Decision || 5 || 3:00 ||
|- style="background:#cfc;"
| 2012-03-15|| Win ||align=left| Dungriang Sitkriangkrai || Rajadamnern Stadium || Bangkok, Thailand || Decision || 5 || 3:00 ||
|- style="background:#cfc;"
| 2012-02-13|| Win ||align=left| Petdam Petnopakao || Rajadamnern Stadium || Bangkok, Thailand || Decision || 5 || 3:00 ||
|- style="background:#cfc;"
| 2012-01-18|| Win ||align=left| Dej Sor Ploenjit || Rajadamnern Stadium || Bangkok, Thailand || Decision || 5 || 3:00 ||
|- style="background:#cfc;"
| 2011-12-08|| Win ||align=left| Raktemroi Visootjaroenyon || Rajadamnern Stadium || Bangkok, Thailand || KO || 5 || ||
|- style="background:#cfc;"
| 2011-11-14|| Win ||align=left| Ongri Barnpeeumruangpeetong || Rajadamnern Stadium || Bangkok, Thailand || Decision || 5 || 3:00 ||
|- style="background:#cfc;"
| 2011-10-20|| Win ||align=left| Pudpadnoi Zujibamikiew || Rajadamnern Stadium || Bangkok, Thailand || Decision || 5 || 3:00 ||
|- style="background:#fbc;"
| 2011-08-18|| Loss ||align=left| Dej Sor Ploenjit || Rajadamnern Stadium || Bangkok, Thailand || Decision || 5 || 3:00 ||
|- style="background:#cfc;"
| 2011-06-27|| Win ||align=left| Puenkon Tor.Surat || Rajadamnern Stadium || Bangkok, Thailand || Decision || 5 || 3:00 ||
|- style="background:#cfc;"
| 2011-04-25|| Win ||align=left| Ongri Barnpeeumruangpeetong || Rajadamnern Stadium || Bangkok, Thailand || Decision || 5 || 3:00 ||
|- style="background:#cfc;"
| 2011-02-21|| Win ||align=left| Puenkon Tor.Surat || Rajadamnern Stadium || Bangkok, Thailand || Decision || 5 || 3:00 ||
|-
| colspan=9 | Legend''':

See also
 List of male kickboxers

References

Panpayak Jitmuangnon
1996 births
Living people
Bantamweight kickboxers
Panpayak Jitmuangnon
ONE Championship kickboxers